The New Orleans Privateers baseball team is a varsity intercollegiate athletic team of the University of New Orleans in New Orleans, Louisiana, United States. The team is a member of the Southland Conference, which is part of the National Collegiate Athletic Association's Division I. The team plays its home games at Maestri Field at Privateer Park in New Orleans, Louisiana. The Privateers are coached by Blake Dean.

History

Bob Hines, first coach (1970–1971)

Formed as early as 1970, the University of New Orleans, formerly known as Louisiana State University of New Orleans, started NCAA play in the Division II ranks. Bob Hines served as the first coach in UNO baseball history, directing the team to an 8–19 record in 1970 – its first season – followed by a 14–25 mark in 1971. The losing record in 1971 would be the last for the UNO program until Tom Schwaner's 1986 squad went 29–30. UNO defeated Southeastern Louisiana 7–6 on Mar. 13, 1970 in the first game in school history.

The Maestri years (1972–1985)
In 1972, Illinois native, Ron Maestri, was hired by then chancellor Homer Hitt as the second head coach to lead the Privateers. Following two consecutive winning seasons in the first two seasons with their new coach, the Privateers made school history in 1974 with a Division II College World Series berth.  In Game 2, the Privateers recorded their first CWS win in a defeat of Valdosta State by a score of 13–9. They followed with a 6–2 win over Central Missouri State in game 6.  After being bested by UC-Irvine, the Privateers bounced back to 2 consecutive wins over University of New Haven and previously unbeaten UC-Irvine.  The comeback fell short, however, as the Privateers lost the final elimination game against UC-Irvine 14–1.  
   
On July 1, 1975, the Privateers made the jump to Division I, hoping to build on their previous success.  They joined the newly formed Sun Belt Conference in which they won the conference tournament in both 1978 and 1979 before becoming an NCAA Division I independent in 1980. After appearing in five NCAA Regionals in eight years, the Privateers finally made Louisiana sports history.  In 1984, the University of New Orleans was the first in-state school to appear in the Division I College World Series. In Game 1, the Privateers were defeated by the reigning CWS champions Texas by a score of 6–3.  They bounced back to defeat and ultimately eliminate Big 10 representative Michigan.  In Game 10 on June 6, however, the University of New Orleans fell to Oklahoma State in 10 innings and was eliminated.

During Maestri's 14 seasons as head coach, the Privateers had a winning record each year, made seven appearances in the NCAA Tournament, one College World Series appearance, and won at least forty games six times, while all other coaches in the school's history have had four such seasons. The program's overall record during his tenure was 517–245–1 (.678), as he is by far the winningest coach in school history.

Tom Schwaner era (1986–1999)
Following the success of Maestri, Tom Schwaner was hired as the third head coach for the Privateers.  After seven years competing as Division I Independents, the Privateers would join 6 teams in the formation of the American South Conference. As members, the Privateers would win the regular season title in 1988, while winning the conference tournament in 1989.  On July 1, 1991, the Privateers would join the Sun Belt Conference once again as the American South and Sun Belt Conference would merge.

After a few up and down years, the Privateers would once again find success in the 1996 season by earning a trip to the South II Regional in Baton Rouge as a 5 seed.  In their first game, the Privateers would defeat Georgia Tech by a score of 13–3 and would follow with a victory over cross town rival Tulane by a score of 13–5.  In their third game, they would face host team LSU and would ultimately lose before being eliminated by Georgia Tech in their fifth game.

Randy Bush (2000–2004)
Before the 2000 campaign, the university would hire former player and two time World Series champion, Randy Bush, as the fourth head coach of the Privateers.  In his first season, the Privateers would record their first regular season title since 1988 and their first in the Sun Belt.  Despite not winning the conference tournament, they would earn a 2 seed in the Baton Rouge Regional due to their success in the regular season.  In their first game of the regional they would fall to Louisiana-Monroe.  Facing elimination, the Privateers would defeat Jackson State before falling once again to Louisiana-Monroe.

Tom Walter and post-Katrina (2005–2009)
Tom Walter was chosen to be the fifth head coach for the Privateers.  Despite the tremendous damage sustained to the East Campus of UNO, the Privateers were able to salvage a winning season and a trip to the Sun Belt Tournament.  Building on their success, the Privateers were able to take the Sun Belt Conference tournament championship in 2007, a feat that had eluded them since 1979, and their first NCAA regional berth since 2000.  In the NCAA regionals, the Privateers shocked host team Wichita State in the first game before losing to Arizona 9–8 and Wichita State to be eliminated.

The Privateers were able continue their success by making it to the SBC Championship Game before losing to the Hilltoppers of Western Kentucky.  Despite not winning an automatic bid, their regular season efforts were enough to earn them a spot as a 3 seed in the Baton Rouge Regional.  They would eventually lose to Southern Miss, defeat Texas Southern in game 3, and be eliminated by in game 5 by Southern Miss.

Bruce Peddie and NCAA division relocation talks (2010–2013)
With the exit of Tom Walter, and talks of a move to Division III or eliminating athletics all together, Assistant Coach Bruce Peddie was promoted to head coach.  The Privateers compiled a 13–39 through the 2010 season in their final campaign in the Sun Belt before they officially left the conference on June 30, 2010. Despite being in division status limbo, the Privateers continued to play Division I opponents during the 2011 season as a Division I Independent and suffered another losing season.

The 2012 season marked the first season the baseball team would not be playing a full Division I schedule since 1975.  Instead, the Privateers were accepted by the Gulf South Conference as a provisional member.  As such, the Privateer baseball team played a largely Division II schedule with the exception of Nicholls State, McNeese, and Southern.   On March 8, 2012, only 11 games into the 2012 season, Chancellor Peter Fos announced that the Privateers would not go through with their intention to compete as a Division II institution and would remain Division I.

With their Division I status reinstated, the Privateers competed in the 2013 season as Division I Independents and completed a 7–44 record.  On May 31, 2013, it was reported that Bruce Peddie was relieved of his duties as head coach.

The return of Ron Maestri (2013–2015)
On July 2, 2013, UNO Athletic Director Derek Morel announced that former baseball coach and athletic director, Ron Maestri, would be returning as the head coach after a 28-year absence from coaching. On February 23, 2015, it was announced that Ron Washington was named volunteer assistant.

On May 19, 2015, Ron Maestri announced his retirement as head coach of the Privateers, effective July 1, 2015.  Maestri finished with a 543–315–1 record with the Privateers over two stints as head coach.  His Privateer teams appeared in the NCAA Division I baseball tournament nine times and in the College World Series two times.

Blake Dean (2016–present)
After being named interim coach on May 21, 2015, Blake Dean was named the seventh head baseball coach of the Privateers for the 2016 season. The team nearly won as many games as they had won the previous three seasons (31 to 33) and more than doubled their win total (from 15 to 31) in Dean's first season  earning a trip to the Southland Conference Tournament marking their first postseason appearance since 2008, which was the last time UNO was invited to the NCAA tournament. In his second year as head coach, the team started 5–0, and ended up defeating in-state rival LSU twice in a season for the first time since 2008. The Privateers once again reached the Southland Tournament but were eliminated by eventual champion Sam Houston State. The program won thirty games in a season in back-to-back years for the first time since the 2007–2008 seasons, and Blake Dean became the only other coach in program history besides Ron Maestri to begin their tenures with back-to-back winning seasons. Dean's 90 wins in his first three seasons trails only Tom Schwaner and Randy Bush for the most wins by a head coach in his first three seasons in school history, and is more than the previous 7 seasons combined (89) immediately preceding his arrival.

Head coaches
Records are through the end of the 2022 baseball season.

Year-by-year results

(Records as of June 5, 2021)
Source:

NCAA Tournament History

Awards

 Golden Spikes Award – Augie Schmidt (1982)
 NCAA Division I All-American Selections – Augie Schmidt (1982), Ted Wood (1987)
 NCAA Division II All-American Selections – Eric Rasmussen (1973), Terry Kieffer (1974)
 NCAA College World Series All-Tournament Team – Scott Raziano (1984)
 Sun Belt Conference Freshman/Rookie of the Year – Steve Stanson (1995)
 Sun Belt Conference Pitcher of the Year – Thomas Diamond (2004), Bryan Cryer (2008)
 Sun Belt Coach of the Year – Ron Maestri (1979)

Professional players

Privateers in the Majors

^Jason Waddell played for the Privateers in 2000 before transferring to Riverside Community College

Source:

Major League Baseball
New Orleans has had 89 Major League Baseball Draft selections since the draft began in 1965.

Trivia
The Privateers have had 2 players compete on the U.S. Olympic Baseball Team.  Joe Slusarski and Ted Wood were both members of the 1988 gold medal team in the Seoul, South Korea Olympics.
As of the 2013 MLB draft, a total of 82 Privateers have been selected. 
The highest drafted Privateer was Augie Schmidt in 1982 as the 2nd overall pick to the Toronto Blue Jays.
The Privateers have finished top 15 in attendance 8 times.  The highest mark achieved was 85,884 spectators in 1987.
Staff members at Maestri Field were awarded the Groundskeeper of the Year by the American Baseball Coaches Association in 1991.

See also
List of NCAA Division I baseball programs

Notes

References

External links